The Spokane City Hall Building is a historic building in Spokane, Washington. It was designed by German-born architect Julius Zittel, and built in 1912. It was used as Spokane's city hall until 1982, when it was replaced with new offices in a former Montgomery Ward department store. The old city hall was listed on the National Register of Historic Places on February 21, 1985.

References

National Register of Historic Places in Spokane County, Washington
City and town halls on the National Register of Historic Places in Washington (state)
Chicago school architecture in Washington (state)
Government buildings completed in 1912